Dark Comedy is a studio album by American hip hop artist Open Mike Eagle. It was released via Mello Music Group on June 10, 2014. It includes guest appearances from Kool A.D. and Hannibal Buress. Music videos were created for "Qualifiers", "A History of Modern Dance", "Doug Stamper (Advice Raps)", "Dark Comedy Morning Show", and "Informations".

Critical reception

At Metacritic, which assigns a weighted average score out of 100 to reviews from mainstream critics, the album received an average score of 73, based on 7 reviews, indicating "generally favorable reviews".

Jessica Rew of HipHopDX gave the album a 4.0 out of 5, saying, "Even with its melancholy closing, Dark Comedy is an incredibly fulfilling listen." Nate Patrin of Pitchfork gave the album an 8.0 out of 10, saying, "Whether it's through casual observation or the to-the-bone identity struggles, Open Mike Eagle's overlap between amusing insights and uncomfortable truths makes for one of the most compelling indie-rap listens of the year so far."

Accolades

Track listing

References

External links
 

2014 albums
Open Mike Eagle albums
Mello Music Group albums
Albums produced by Dibiase
Albums produced by Kenny Segal